Teicher is a surname. Notable people with the surname include:

 Howard Teicher, former U.S. National Security Council aide
 Louis Teicher (1924–2008), American pianist
 Victor Teicher, American investor and convicted felon

German-language surnames
German toponymic surnames